Dublin Township is the name of some places in the U.S. state of Pennsylvania:

 Dublin Township, Fulton County, Pennsylvania
 Dublin Township, Huntingdon County, Pennsylvania

See also 
 Lower Dublin Township, Pennsylvania, defunct, part of the defunct Dublin Township in Philadelphia County
 Upper Dublin Township, Montgomery County, Pennsylvania 

Pennsylvania township disambiguation pages